Bader Abdulrahman Al-Muhana (born November 15, 1988) is a Saudi Arabian swimmer, who specialized in butterfly events. A lone swimmer at the 2008 Summer Olympics and a graduate of King Faisal School in his hometown Riyadh, Al-Muhana swam for the Indiana Hoosiers throughout most of his college career, while pursuing international business studies at Indiana University in Bloomington, Indiana.

Al-Muhana was invited by FINA to compete for Saudi Arabia in the men's 100 m butterfly at the 2008 Summer Olympics in Beijing Swimming on the outside in heat two, Al-Muhana put up an effort from the start to tie for fifth with Egypt's Ahmed Nada in a matching 55.59. Al-Muhana failed to advance to the semi-finals, as he placed sixty-first overall with Nada in the prelims.

References

External links
Profile – Indiana Hoosiers
NBC Olympics Profile

1988 births
Living people
Saudi Arabian male swimmers
Olympic swimmers of Saudi Arabia
Swimmers at the 2008 Summer Olympics
Male butterfly swimmers
Indiana Hoosiers men's swimmers
Sportspeople from Riyadh
Swimmers at the 2006 Asian Games
Asian Games competitors for Saudi Arabia
20th-century Saudi Arabian people
21st-century Saudi Arabian people